Palehound is an American band fronted by Ellen Kempner who have released three albums, Dry Food (2015), A Place I'll Always Go (2017) and Black Friday (2019); as well as the Bent Nail EP (2013) and a number of 7" singles. Initially a solo project, the band currently features Kempner on vocals/guitar, Zoë Brecher on drums and Larz Brogan on bass. In 2015 the band received the Boston Music Award as new artist of the year.

History 
Ellen Kempner (born June 10, 1994), is the daughter of Janet and Jim Kempner. Together with a younger sister, she grew up in Westport, Connecticut, where she attended the Staples High School. She developed an interest in playing music at an early age and had guitar lessons from her father. In high school she formed the band Cheerleader together with the drummer Max Kupperberg. During high school, Kempner recorded demos in Garageband, which were later heard by Dan Goldin, the co-founder of Exploding in Sound.

In 2012 she moved to New York City, where she attended Sarah Lawrence College and studied music. There she recorded the six track EP Bent Nail with Carlos Hernandez and Julian Fader of Ava Luna. Her debut as Palehound was through the digital release of the song "Pet Carrot" in August 2013. The EP received a physical release through Exploding in Sound Records in October 2013. She later described it as “when I first recorded [it], I was a little scared to put all the cards on the table". What initially had been a "bedroom recording project" was transferred to the live-stage. In 2013 Kempner performed at CMJ described as "unflinching, whimsical lyrics with pleasantly off-kilter guitar work". She dropped out of college and moved to Boston. In February 2014, the single "Kitchen" was released.

In August 2015, Palehound released the album Dry Food, produced by Gabe Wax in the US, while Heavenly Records followed in March 2016. In the same month, the band embarked on a UK/European tour in support of the album. Kempner worked with Real to Reel Filmschool in Boston on a video for the song "Cushioned Caging" that appeared in June 2016.
On March 6, 2017, Ellen announced that Palehound had signed over to Polyvinyl Records. Their 2017 album A Place I'll Always Go was released on June 16, and followed by Black Friday in June 2019, described by Pitchfork as "reach[ing] far toward the hazy horizon, letting the nervous energy of Palehound's first two LPs mount and unspool".

Musical style 
Kempner describes her music as "journal rock," a term she explains in an interview with Sound of Boston: "it’s kind of like journal-rock, just all of my biggest fears splurted onto some vinyl, no different from writing a diary, really.”

Discography

Albums 
Dry Food (2015)
A Place I'll Always Go (2017)
Black Friday (2019)

EPs 
Bent Nail (2013)

Singles 
"Kitchen" (2014)
"Molly" (2016)
"Worthy" (2019)
"See a Light" (2020)

References

External links
 Palehound on Bandcamp

Heavenly Recordings artists
Musical groups from Boston